The Merdeka Award is a Malaysian award that recognises and celebrates the achievements and significant contributions of individuals to Malaysia and its people, within their respective fields.
 
The Royal Patron of the Merdeka Award Trust is the Sultan of Perak Darul Ridzuan, Sultan Nazrin Muizzuddin Shah.

Founding
The Merdeka Award was launched on 27 August 2007 in conjunction with the 50th anniversary of the independence of Malaysia. It was founded by PETRONAS, ExxonMobil and Shell.

Award Process
The Merdeka Award is conferred annually to individuals and/or organisations, both Malaysians and non-Malaysians, based on excellent works that have made outstanding and lasting contributions to Malaysia, in their respective fields.

Categories
There are five award categories:
 Education and Community
 Environment
 Health, Science and Technology
 Outstanding Scholastic Achievement
 Outstanding Contribution to the People of Malaysia

Eligibility
The Award is open to all living Malaysian citizens – individuals and organisations.

However, only non-citizens are eligible for the Outstanding Contribution to the People of Malaysia category, whilst the Outstanding Scholastic Achievement category is open only for individuals.

Nomination and Selection
The nomination and selection is an independent, objective and fair process administered by a Board of Trustees, Selection Committee and Nomination Committees.

Nomination Committee

The role is to identify, deliberate, shortlist and recommend candidates to the Selection Committee. There are five committees, one for each category. Each committee comprises three members, except for Education and Community which has five members.

Selection Committee

The role is to deliberate the merits of the candidates put forward by the Nomination Committees and recommend shortlisted candidates to the Board. There are five members in the Selection Committee.

Merdeka Award Board of Trustees

The role is to make a final selection of the recipients. The decision must be unanimous with one award for each category, through there may not be recipients in every category each year. The Award can be shared by as many as two recipients. The Board comprises representatives of the founding members, as well as two independent members.

Award Ceremonies
The winners are announced each year in the month of Merdeka in conjunction with Malaysia's Independence Day, with the Merdeka Award Ceremony taking place later in the year.

Award recipients
 2008

Education and Community

Royal Professor Ungku Abdul Aziz bin Ungku Abdul Hamid

For outstanding contribution to the eradication of poverty, rural economics and the development of Tabung Haji and in the field of Education

Environment

Malaysian Nature Society (MNS)

For outstanding contribution to the Belum-Temenggor Forest Complex Conservation Initiative

Health, Science and Technology

Nipah Virus Encephalitis Investigation Team from the Faculty of Medicine, University of Malaya (Joint Recipient)

For outstanding contribution to the discovery and understanding of the causes, effects and control of the Nipah Encephalitis viral infection

and

Professor Emeritus Dato' Dr Khalid Kadir (Joint Recipient)

For outstanding contribution to the study and understanding of diabetes and the relationship between hormones and stresses in various tissues

Outstanding Contribution to the People of Malaysia

Datuk Leslie Davidson

For outstanding contribution in the introduction of the pollinating insects Elaedobius kamerunicus from Africa to the oil palm and plantations in Malaysia, leading to the rapid development of the palm oil industry

 2009

Education and Community

Tun Dr Fatimah Hashim (Joint Recipient)

For outstanding contribution to the empowerment of women in Malaysia and for protecting and securing rights and economic opportunities for women through advocacy

and

Dato’ Lim Phaik Gan (Joint Recipient)

For outstanding contribution to the empowerment of women in Malaysia and for protecting and securing rights and economic opportunities for women through advocacy

Health, Science and Technology

Professor Datuk Dr Halimaton Hamdan

For outstanding contribution in the development and application of Maerogel as a commercially viable multi-purpose material

Outstanding Scholastic Achievement

Dato’ Seri Ir Dr Zaini Ujang

For outstanding study and scholarly contributions in the various environmental initiatives concerning water supply, sewage, river rehabilitation and industrial ecology

 2010

Education and Community

Datin Paduka Mother A Mangalam A/P S Iyaswamy Iyer

For outstanding contribution in promoting the welfare of the underprivileged and for fostering national unity

Outstanding Scholastic Achievement

Academician Emeritus Professor Dr Yong Hoi Sen (Joint Recipient)

For outstanding contribution to the development of basic and applied knowledge of Genetics, Molecular Biology, Biological Systematics, Evolutionary Biology and Biological Diversity of Malaysia's flora and fauna

and

Distinguished Professor Dr Harith Ahmad (Joint Recipient)

For outstanding contribution in research and promoting the development of photonics in Malaysia

Outstanding Contribution to the People of Malaysia

Tan Sri Just Faaland

For outstanding contribution to the advocacy of equitable growth through eradication of poverty and reduction of socio-economic polarisation

 2011

Environment

Dato’ Dr Kenneth Yeang

For outstanding contribution to the development of design methods for the ecological design and planning of the built environment

Outstanding Scholastic Achievement

Professor Dato’ Dr Goh Khean Lee (Joint Recipient)

For outstanding contribution in elevating the study and practice of gastroenterology and hepatology in Malaysia to global standards

and

Professor Dr Mak Joon Wah (Joint Recipient)

For outstanding fundamental and applied research in parasitology and parasitic diseases, public health and pathology

 2012

Health, Science and Technology

Academician Tan Sri Emeritus Professor Datuk Dr Augustine Ong Soon Hock

For outstanding contribution to the research and development of the chemistry and technology of palm oil, and for his significant role in advocating and promoting the Malaysian palm oil industry to the world

Outstanding Scholastic Achievement

Tan Sri Professor Dr Syed Muhammad Naquib al-Attas

For outstanding contribution to the scholarly research in the area of Islamisation of contemporary knowledge and of Muslim education

Outstanding Contribution to the People of Malaysia

Dr Engkik Soepadmo

For outstanding contribution to the research and conservation of Malaysia's forest plant diversity

 2013

Education and Community

Tan Sri Dato’ Seri Utama Arshad Ayub (Joint Recipient)

For outstanding contribution in shaping Malaysia's education landscape through the development of professional education, education reforms and innovation that have resulted in education becoming more accessible to Malaysians

and

Raja Tan Sri Dato’ Seri Utama Muhammad Alias Raja Muhammad Ali (Joint Recipient)

For outstanding contribution to rural development and rural reform through organising successful land settlement projects (FELDA) for the many landless, rural population in Malaysia

Environment Category

Dr Lim Boo Liat

For outstanding contribution to the conservation of Malaysia's biological diversity through the study, understanding and control of vector-borne diseases and the relationship between diseases and the environment; and for advocating the protection of Malaysia's natural heritage

Health, Science and Technology

Tan Sri Dato’ Dr Yahya Awang

For outstanding contribution to pioneering the development of clinical research and cardiac surgery in Malaysia, and for his instrumental role in the establishment of the National Heart Institute (IJN)

Outstanding Scholastic Achievement

Emeritus Professor Dato’ Dr Lam Sai Kit

For outstanding contribution to scholarly research and development in medical virology and emerging infectious diseases including dengue

 2014

Education and Community

Datuk Mohd Nor Khalid (Lat)

For outstanding contribution to the promotion and pluralism of Malaysia's cultural identity through the use of cartoons and for the promotion of understanding and respect among Malaysia's diverse ethnic communities

Environment

Mohd Khan Momin Khan

For outstanding contribution to wildlife research and conservation through the setting up of captive breeding centres, as well as for pioneering and successfully managing human-wildlife conflict in affected areas

Health, Science and Technology

Datuk Dr Choo Yuen May

For outstanding contribution to the development of novel, efficient and green processes for the palm-based industry through research and commercialisation of various technologies

Outstanding Scholastic Achievement

Professor Dr Abdul Latif Ahmad (Joint Recipient)

For outstanding contribution to the scholarly research and development of technologies in the areas of polymer science, wastewater treatment and membrane separation technology

and

Professor Dr Ahmad Fauzi Ismail (Joint Recipient)

For outstanding contribution to scholarly research and development of technologies for commercialisation in membrane performance for both gas separation, and water and wastewater treatment

Outstanding Contribution to the People of Malaysia

Dato Sri Gathorne, Earl of Cranbrook

For outstanding contribution in pioneering research and conservation of Malaysia's forest biodiversity and the ecology and biology of Malaysian mammals and birds, and for advocating environmental conservation

 2015

Education and Community

Tan Sri Dr Jemilah Mahmood

For outstanding contribution to the development of humanitarian and international emergency relief.

Environment

Emeritus Professor Dato’ Dr Abdul Latiff Mohamad (Joint Recipient)

For outstanding contribution to the research and understanding of plant taxonomy and conservation biology in Malaysia.

and

Professor Emeritus Tan Sri Dr Zakri Abdul Hamid (Joint Recipient)

For outstanding contribution to the observation, analysis and assessment of biodiversity and ecosystem services, fostering the remediation and protection of the natural environment and promoting environmental sustainability in Malaysia and globally.

Health, Science and Technology

Professor Datin Paduka Dr Khatijah Mohamad Yusoff

For outstanding contribution in the field of microbiology and virology through a better understanding and diagnosis of contagious and fatal viruses in poultry and the study of the potential of the virus in combating cancer cells.

Outstanding Scholastic Achievement

Professor Dr Ir Mohd Ali Hashim

For outstanding scholastic contribution in the research of separation processes and water and wastewater treatment and for his instrumental role in the setting-up of the Centre for Ionic Liquids.

Outstanding Contribution to the People of Malaysia

Dr Elizabeth Lesley Bennett

For outstanding contribution to the conservation and management of wetland habitats and that of endangered wildlife in Malaysia through research, advocacy and policies.

 2016

Education and Community

Tan Sri Lakshmanan Krishnan

For outstanding contribution to laying the foundation for the modern film industry in the country and for his instrumental role in developing early acting talents including Malaysian film icon the late P Ramlee.

Environment

Tan Sri Dato’ Seri Dr Salleh Mohd Nor

For outstanding contribution to the conservation of the natural environment and forestry in Malaysia through his leadership role at the Forest Research Institute Malaysia (FRIM) and the Malaysian Nature Society (MNS).

Health, Science and Technology

Distinguished Professor Datuk Dr Looi Lai Meng

For outstanding contribution in pioneering research in amyloidosis, renal pathology and cancer pathology and for her significant contributions and role in promoting the field of pathology in Malaysia and the region.

Outstanding Scholastic Achievement

Professor Dato’ Ir Dr Wan Ramli Wan Daud

For outstanding scholarly research and development in advancing the technology of fuel cells and hydrogen energy in Malaysia and the region.

Prizes
Each award category carries a cash prize of RM300,000 and comes with a trophy and an inscribed certificate.

Logo & trophy design

The Merdeka Award Logo and Trophy was designed by Dato’ Johan Ariff, the Creative Director of Johan Design Associates, who also designed the PETRONAS logo in 1974.

The trophy, a three-dimensional version of the logo was specially designed using Lapis Lazuli gemstone as its base, and combined with elements of gold, silver, Malaysian pewter and Malaysian hardwood, Chengal.

Merdeka Award Grant for International Attachment (MA Grant)
An extension of the Merdeka Award, the Merdeka Award Grant for International Attachment (MA Grant) was launched in April 2012 as a signature outreach programme by the Merdeka Award Trust. The MA Grant enables recipients to participate in collaborative projects and/or programmes for up to three months, at selected internationally acclaimed institutions, corporations, agencies and organisations within the network of the Merdeka Award's three founding partners – PETRONAS, ExxonMobil and Shell.

Grant eligibility
The MA Grant is open to all qualified Malaysians between 22 and 35 years of age, who are able to demonstrate the Spirit of Merdeka within their areas of expertise.

Only two grants are awarded in each year to candidates within these disciplines:
 Education and Community
 Environment
 Health, Science and Technology

The broad categories involved for the consideration of the MA Grant are:
 Visual and performing arts
 Heritage and social work
 Traditional disciplines including economics, finance and scientific specialties
 Environmental studies including climate change, biodiversity, and environmental protection and conservation

Nomination & selection

Three steps are involved in the selection process:

Submission

Reviewed by the Merdeka Award Secretariat, all applications must be submitted together with an Attachment Proposal and Attachment Budget, outlining the proposed area of research, projected expenses, expected outcomes and benefits to Malaysia and her people.

Shortlist

Interviews are then conducted by the Selection Committee, represented by the representatives of the Human Resources Divisions at PETRONAS, ExxonMobil and Shell. Candidates are comprehensively evaluated based on various criteria including the quality of their proposal, relevance of proposed area of research, innovativeness in area and method of research, philosophy and commitment to community building, and public speaking, social and media skills.

Final Selection

Recommendations of outstanding candidates are made to the Merdeka Award Board of Trustees, which makes the final selection.

Grant recipients

 2013

Dr Natrah Fatin Mohd Ikhsan

For research towards better microbial resource management for sustainable agriculture production

Assistant Professor Dr Abhimanyu Veerakumarasivam

For research towards excellence and sustainability in cancer genetics

 2014

Dr Kamalan Jeevaratnam

For research into cardiac cellular therapy via stem cells, in-vitro differentiation mechanism for cardiac stem cells for large scale production, and cellular cardiomyopathy therapy application

Dr Lim Hong Ngee

For research and development of a smart nanotechnology-based breast cancer testing scheme

 2015

Ms Chua Ling Ling

For research towards understanding how the gut microbiome (bacterial in the gut) interacts with the immune system and leads to the development of age-related illnesses and premature aging

Dr Mohd Sukor Su'ait

For research into fabrication of solid-state dye-sensitized solar cell (DSSC) utilising Malaysian commodities such as rubber, palm and seaweeds as solid polymer electrolyte.

 2016

Dr Khamarrul Azahari Razak

For research that focuses on the various approaches of strengthening natural disaster research and promoting integrated university-government-industry partnership for managing and reducing disaster risks in changing environments.

Ms Koh Lily

For research on developing expertise and academic exchanges on innovative SME business models in encouraging Malaysian SMEs to effectively place themselves in the value chain. This is in light of Industry 4.0, an EU Commission initiative under the Horizon 2020 plan, which is part of the EU Framework Programme for Research and Innovation.

Merdeka Award Roundtables
The Merdeka Award Roundtables, a made-for-TV event that is carried on ASTRO Awani Channel 501, are a series of TV talk shows designed to inspire, debate and discuss key issues of interest to Malaysians.

First launched in August 2011, the Roundtables feature leading figures from Malaysia's corporate, academic and social spheres, coming together to discuss issues.

Merdeka Award Thumbs-Up Challenge

The Merdeka Award Thumbs-Up Challenge is an initiative organised by The Merdeka Award Trust, to create a platform for all Malaysians to share impactful and sustainable ideas based on select themes. The initiative encourages participants to contribute an idea that has been tested and is impactful.
 
First launched in 2015, the Thumbs-Up Challenge recognises ideas from each themed Challenge and the best overall idea could be implemented on a larger scale through the Merdeka Award's wide network.

References

Malaysian culture
Malaysian awards